The Environment and Forests Department [Tamil Nadu], is a Tamil Nadu government ministry.

History 
The Department of Environment was created in 1995 as the Nodal Department for environmental management of the state.

Sub-departments

Undertakings and bodies

Ministers for Forests

Current Minister 

 M. Mathiventhan

Former Ministers 

 K. Ramachandran (2021-2022)
 Dindigul C. Srinivasan (2016-2021)

Minister for Environment and Pollution Control

Current Minister 
Siva V. Meyyanathan

Former Ministers for Environment and Pollution Control 
 T. P. M. Mohideen Khan (2006-2011)
 K. T. Pachaimal (2011-2016)
 K. C. Karupannan (2016-2021)

See also 
 Government of Tamil Nadu
 Tamil Nadu Government's Departments
 Ministry of Environment and Forests (India)
 Department of Finance (Kerala)
 Van Vigyan Kendra (VVK) Forest Science Centres

References

External links
 Environment and Forests Department
 http://www.tn.gov.in/rti/proact_eandf.htm (RTI Site of the Environment and Forests Department, Tamil Nadu)
 http://www.tn.gov.in (Official website of Government of Tamil Nadu)

Tamil Nadu state government departments
Tamil Nadu
Tamil Nadu
Environment of Tamil Nadu
1995 establishments in Tamil Nadu